Mariateresa Di Lascia (3 January 1954 – 10 September 1994) was an Italian politician and writer, activist, human rights' supporter and advocate of non-violence.

Biography
Di Lascia was born in Rocchetta Sant'Antonio, Italy. She attended college in the University of Naples. She was studying of Medicine with the goal of becoming a lay missionary. However within three years she had become so involved in her political activism that she left university.

Political activity

Di Lascia joined the Radical Party in 1975. In 1982 she was elected as the national deputy secretary of the party under the leadership of Marco Pannella. Her initial activism was aimed at eliminating hunger. She coordinated the Survival 82 campaign mobilising mayors in France, Belgium and Italy to support laws against hunger. Di Lascia was an environmental activist, acting to remove and prevent nuclear power in Italy. She proposed penitentiary reform in 1990 and the abolition of the death penalty in 1993. Di Lascia created a campaign to support victims of the war of the former Yugoslavia with Adriano Sofri in 1993. She also demonstrated about the liberation of Tibet at the Human Rights Conference in Vienna the same year. Di Lascia was in favour of Hahnemannian homeopathic medicine and in 1991 she founded the Homeopathic Patients Association (APO) as well as advocating for its legislation. The association is based in Naples. Di Lascia was the editor and a contributor for the newspaper Radical News in 1985 and 1986. Her articles were on ecology, medicine, justice and political current affairs. She also aired shows on both Radio Radicale and on Tele Roma 56.

Personal life
Lascia died in Rome on 10 September 1994, at the age of 40. Her death, of cancer, came just a few months after marrying Sergio D'Elia. Her first novel was Passage in Shadow which won the Strega Prize in 1995.

References and sources

1954 births
1994 deaths
Italian women non-fiction writers
20th-century Italian women politicians
20th-century Italian women writers
Nonviolence advocates
Radical Party (Italy) politicians
Italian Radicals politicians
Anti–death penalty activists
Italian environmentalists
Italian human rights activists
20th-century Italian non-fiction writers
Italian political writers
Deaths from cancer in Lazio